Gwynne–Love House, also known as Goldmuntz Cascade House, is a historic house in Colorado Springs, Colorado that was placed on the National Register of Historic Places and the Colorado State Register of Historic Properties in 1987.

Geography
The house is located in central Colorado Springs on a bluff overlooking Monument Valley Park near Colorado College and the Colorado Springs Fine Arts Center.

Description
Edmiston Gwynne had a Queen Anne house built with English architectural details that was designed by Willard B. Perkins in 1886. The original owner died soon after its completion however, and the building was converted into a boarding house to meet the demand generated by the 1891 Cripple Creek gold discovery.  It was purchased in 1914 by the Love family that had moved to Colorado from Indianapolis and used as a private residence.   It was converted back to apartments in the 1950s.  The house is significant as one of the last remaining stately homes built in the early history of Colorado Springs.

References

Houses on the National Register of Historic Places in Colorado
Buildings and structures in Colorado Springs, Colorado
History of Colorado Springs, Colorado
Colorado State Register of Historic Properties
Houses in El Paso County, Colorado
National Register of Historic Places in Colorado Springs, Colorado
Houses completed in 1886
Queen Anne architecture in Colorado